Vere Fane, 5th Earl of Westmorland (25 May 1678 – 19 May 1698), styled The Honourable Vere Fane between 1678 and 1691 and Lord le Despenser between 1691 and 1693, was a British peer and member of the House of Lords. He was the second son (but oldest surviving son) of Vere Fane, 4th Earl of Westmorland and his wife Rachel Bence; as well as the older brother of Thomas Fane and John Fane. When his father died in 1693, Vere Fane inherited the Earldom of Westmorland, as well as his father's further titles Baron Burghersh and Lord le Despenser. Fane died in 1698 at the age of 19, unmarried and without any issue, and was succeeded by his younger brother Thomas.

References

Literature

1678 births
1698 deaths
17th-century English nobility
Vere
Earls of Westmorland
Barons le Despencer
Barons Burghersh